Epic is a production and publishing company founded in 2013 by journalists Joshuah Bearman and Joshua Davis as a new venue for telling extraordinary true stories. Epic magazine has achieved a number of entertainment deals in the film and television history .

Epic magazine was established by Josh Davis and Joshuah Bearman in 2013. On April 15, 2019, The Hollywood Reporter announced that the magazine was acquired by Vox Media.

References

External links
 Official website

2019 mergers and acquisitions
Magazines established in 2013
Online magazines published in the United States